The State Hermitage Museum is a museum in Bayreuth, Germany. 

The museum was created from a historical park with fountains, constructed in 1715. Notable buildings include the Old Palace, a New Castle with sun temple, and other smaller buildings.

References

External links
http://www.schloesser.bayern.de/englisch/palace/objects/bay_as.htm
http://www.bayreuth-wilhelmine.de/englisch/garden_er/gesch.htm
http://artmarketservices.com/index.php?title=Bayreuth_-_Hermitage

Museums in Bavaria